Antarctic Point is a headland which marks the west side of the entrance to Antarctic Bay on the north coast of South Georgia. It was charted in the period 1926–30 by Discovery Investigations personnel, who named it after nearby Antarctic Bay.

See also
Contrast Rocks

References
 

Headlands of South Georgia